The large Lifou white-eye (Zosterops inornatus) is a species of bird in the family Zosteropidae. It is endemic to New Caledonia.

References

Birds described in 1878
Endemic birds of New Caledonia
Zosterops
Taxonomy articles created by Polbot